The 2002–03 Nashville Predators season was the Nashville Predators' 5th season in the National Hockey League (NHL). The Predators missed the playoffs for the fifth consecutive year.

Off-season
Greg Johnson was named team captain on October 8. In addition to being an alternate captain for home games, Scott Walker was briefly interim captain during Johnson’s absence due to injury during the season.

Regular season

The Predators tied the Calgary Flames, Minnesota Wild and Pittsburgh Penguins for most times shut out, with 10, and tied the Montreal Canadiens for fewest short-handed goals scored, with 2.

Final standings

Schedule and results

|- align="center" bgcolor="#FFBBBB"
|1||L||October 11, 2002||4–5 || align="left"| @ Washington Capitals (2002–03) ||0–1–0–0 || 
|- align="center" bgcolor="#FFBBBB"
|2||L||October 12, 2002||2–3 || align="left"|  Edmonton Oilers (2002–03) ||0–2–0–0 || 
|- align="center" bgcolor="#FF6F6F"
|3||OTL||October 15, 2002||3–4 OT|| align="left"| @ New York Islanders (2002–03) ||0–2–0–1 || 
|- align="center" bgcolor="#FF6F6F"
|4||OTL||October 18, 2002||2–3 OT|| align="left"| @ New Jersey Devils (2002–03) ||0–2–0–2 || 
|- align="center" 
|5||T||October 19, 2002||2–2 OT|| align="left"| @ New York Rangers (2002–03) ||0–2–1–2 || 
|- align="center" bgcolor="#FFBBBB"
|6||L||October 22, 2002||1–2 || align="left"|  Phoenix Coyotes (2002–03) ||0–3–1–2 || 
|- align="center" bgcolor="#FFBBBB"
|7||L||October 24, 2002||1–2 || align="left"|  San Jose Sharks (2002–03) ||0–4–1–2 || 
|- align="center" bgcolor="#CCFFCC" 
|8||W||October 26, 2002||3–1 || align="left"|  Detroit Red Wings (2002–03) ||1–4–1–2 || 
|- align="center" bgcolor="#FFBBBB"
|9||L||October 30, 2002||0–7 || align="left"| @ St. Louis Blues (2002–03) ||1–5–1–2 || 
|-

|- align="center" bgcolor="#FF6F6F"
|10||OTL||November 2, 2002||5–6 OT|| align="left"| @ Los Angeles Kings (2002–03) ||1–5–1–3 || 
|- align="center" bgcolor="#FF6F6F"
|11||OTL||November 3, 2002||1–2 OT|| align="left"| @ Phoenix Coyotes (2002–03) ||1–5–1–4 || 
|- align="center" bgcolor="#FFBBBB"
|12||L||November 6, 2002||1–2 || align="left"| @ Mighty Ducks of Anaheim (2002–03) ||1–6–1–4 || 
|- align="center" 
|13||T||November 7, 2002||2–2 OT|| align="left"| @ San Jose Sharks (2002–03) ||1–6–2–4 || 
|- align="center" bgcolor="#CCFFCC" 
|14||W||November 10, 2002||4–3 || align="left"| @ Colorado Avalanche (2002–03) ||2–6–2–4 || 
|- align="center" bgcolor="#FFBBBB"
|15||L||November 12, 2002||1–4 || align="left"| @ Detroit Red Wings (2002–03) ||2–7–2–4 || 
|- align="center" bgcolor="#FFBBBB"
|16||L||November 14, 2002||1–3 || align="left"|  Colorado Avalanche (2002–03) ||2–8–2–4 || 
|- align="center" 
|17||T||November 16, 2002||1–1 OT|| align="left"|  Columbus Blue Jackets (2002–03) ||2–8–3–4 || 
|- align="center" bgcolor="#FFBBBB"
|18||L||November 17, 2002||2–4 || align="left"| @ Chicago Blackhawks (2002–03) ||2–9–3–4 || 
|- align="center" 
|19||T||November 21, 2002||1–1 OT|| align="left"| @ Colorado Avalanche (2002–03) ||2–9–4–4 || 
|- align="center" bgcolor="#FFBBBB"
|20||L||November 23, 2002||2–4 || align="left"| @ Minnesota Wild (2002–03) ||2–10–4–4 || 
|- align="center" bgcolor="#CCFFCC" 
|21||W||November 27, 2002||4–2 || align="left"|  San Jose Sharks (2002–03) ||3–10–4–4 || 
|- align="center" bgcolor="#FFBBBB"
|22||L||November 29, 2002||1–2 || align="left"|  New Jersey Devils (2002–03) ||3–11–4–4 || 
|- align="center" bgcolor="#CCFFCC" 
|23||W||November 30, 2002||5–2 || align="left"|  Dallas Stars (2002–03) ||4–11–4–4 || 
|-

|- align="center" bgcolor="#FFBBBB"
|24||L||December 3, 2002||1–2 || align="left"|  Carolina Hurricanes (2002–03) ||4–12–4–4 || 
|- align="center" bgcolor="#CCFFCC" 
|25||W||December 5, 2002||3–2 || align="left"| @ Los Angeles Kings (2002–03) ||5–12–4–4 || 
|- align="center" bgcolor="#CCFFCC" 
|26||W||December 7, 2002||4–2 || align="left"| @ San Jose Sharks (2002–03) ||6–12–4–4 || 
|- align="center" bgcolor="#FFBBBB"
|27||L||December 8, 2002||0–3 || align="left"| @ Mighty Ducks of Anaheim (2002–03) ||6–13–4–4 || 
|- align="center" bgcolor="#FFBBBB"
|28||L||December 10, 2002||0–3 || align="left"|  Los Angeles Kings (2002–03) ||6–14–4–4 || 
|- align="center" 
|29||T||December 12, 2002||2–2 OT|| align="left"|  St. Louis Blues (2002–03) ||6–14–5–4 || 
|- align="center" bgcolor="#CCFFCC" 
|30||W||December 14, 2002||3–1 || align="left"|  Minnesota Wild (2002–03) ||7–14–5–4 || 
|- align="center" bgcolor="#FFBBBB"
|31||L||December 17, 2002||0–3 || align="left"|  Calgary Flames (2002–03) ||7–15–5–4 || 
|- align="center" bgcolor="#FFBBBB"
|32||L||December 19, 2002||1–3 || align="left"|  Vancouver Canucks (2002–03) ||7–16–5–4 || 
|- align="center" 
|33||T||December 21, 2002||2–2 OT|| align="left"| @ Tampa Bay Lightning (2002–03) ||7–16–6–4 || 
|- align="center" bgcolor="#CCFFCC" 
|34||W||December 23, 2002||3–2 OT|| align="left"| @ Florida Panthers (2002–03) ||8–16–6–4 || 
|- align="center" bgcolor="#CCFFCC" 
|35||W||December 26, 2002||3–1 || align="left"|  Dallas Stars (2002–03) ||9–16–6–4 || 
|- align="center" bgcolor="#FFBBBB"
|36||L||December 28, 2002||2–4 || align="left"|  Detroit Red Wings (2002–03) ||9–17–6–4 || 
|- align="center" bgcolor="#CCFFCC" 
|37||W||December 30, 2002||3–2 || align="left"|  Ottawa Senators (2002–03) ||10–17–6–4 || 
|-

|- align="center" bgcolor="#FFBBBB"
|38||L||January 1, 2003||3–7 || align="left"|  Colorado Avalanche (2002–03) ||10–18–6–4 || 
|- align="center" 
|39||T||January 4, 2003||3–3 OT|| align="left"|  Chicago Blackhawks (2002–03) ||10–18–7–4 || 
|- align="center" bgcolor="#CCFFCC" 
|40||W||January 6, 2003||5–1 || align="left"| @ Columbus Blue Jackets (2002–03) ||11–18–7–4 || 
|- align="center" bgcolor="#CCFFCC" 
|41||W||January 7, 2003||2–1 OT|| align="left"|  St. Louis Blues (2002–03) ||12–18–7–4 || 
|- align="center" bgcolor="#CCFFCC" 
|42||W||January 11, 2003||4–3 OT|| align="left"|  Phoenix Coyotes (2002–03) ||13–18–7–4 || 
|- align="center" bgcolor="#FFBBBB"
|43||L||January 12, 2003||0–2 || align="left"| @ Chicago Blackhawks (2002–03) ||13–19–7–4 || 
|- align="center" bgcolor="#FFBBBB"
|44||L||January 14, 2003||3–4 || align="left"| @ Vancouver Canucks (2002–03) ||13–20–7–4 || 
|- align="center" 
|45||T||January 16, 2003||2–2 OT|| align="left"| @ Calgary Flames (2002–03) ||13–20–8–4 || 
|- align="center" bgcolor="#CCFFCC" 
|46||W||January 18, 2003||3–2 OT|| align="left"| @ Edmonton Oilers (2002–03) ||14–20–8–4 || 
|- align="center" bgcolor="#CCFFCC" 
|47||W||January 21, 2003||3–2 || align="left"|  Vancouver Canucks (2002–03) ||15–20–8–4 || 
|- align="center" bgcolor="#FFBBBB"
|48||L||January 23, 2003||2–4 || align="left"|  New York Rangers (2002–03) ||15–21–8–4 || 
|- align="center" bgcolor="#CCFFCC" 
|49||W||January 25, 2003||3–2 || align="left"|  Tampa Bay Lightning (2002–03) ||16–21–8–4 || 
|- align="center" bgcolor="#CCFFCC" 
|50||W||January 27, 2003||5–1 || align="left"| @ Buffalo Sabres (2002–03) ||17–21–8–4 || 
|- align="center" bgcolor="#FFBBBB"
|51||L||January 28, 2003||1–2 || align="left"| @ Boston Bruins (2002–03) ||17–22–8–4 || 
|- align="center" bgcolor="#FFBBBB"
|52||L||January 30, 2003||1–2 || align="left"| @ Columbus Blue Jackets (2002–03) ||17–23–8–4 || 
|-

|- align="center" 
|53||T||February 4, 2003||5–5 OT|| align="left"| @ Detroit Red Wings (2002–03) ||17–23–9–4 || 
|- align="center" bgcolor="#CCFFCC" 
|54||W||February 8, 2003||3–2 || align="left"|  Columbus Blue Jackets (2002–03) ||18–23–9–4 || 
|- align="center" bgcolor="#FFBBBB"
|55||L||February 11, 2003||2–3 || align="left"|  Los Angeles Kings (2002–03) ||18–24–9–4 || 
|- align="center" bgcolor="#CCFFCC" 
|56||W||February 13, 2003||2–0 || align="left"|  New York Islanders (2002–03) ||19–24–9–4 || 
|- align="center" bgcolor="#CCFFCC" 
|57||W||February 15, 2003||2–1 || align="left"|  Mighty Ducks of Anaheim (2002–03) ||20–24–9–4 || 
|- align="center" bgcolor="#CCFFCC" 
|58||W||February 17, 2003||5–1 || align="left"|  Boston Bruins (2002–03) ||21–24–9–4 || 
|- align="center" bgcolor="#CCFFCC"
|59||W||February 20, 2003||4–1 || align="left"|  Calgary Flames (2002–03) ||22–24–9–4 || 
|- align="center" bgcolor="#FFBBBB"
|60||L||February 22, 2003||0–4 || align="left"| @ Ottawa Senators (2002–03) ||22–25–9–4 || 
|- align="center" bgcolor="#CCFFCC" 
|61||W||February 23, 2003||5–2 || align="left"| @ Toronto Maple Leafs (2002–03) ||23–25–9–4 || 
|- align="center" bgcolor="#CCFFCC" 
|62||W||February 25, 2003||5–0 || align="left"|  Columbus Blue Jackets (2002–03) ||24–25–9–4 || 
|- align="center" bgcolor="#CCFFCC" 
|63||W||February 27, 2003||6–0 || align="left"|  Pittsburgh Penguins (2002–03) ||25–25–9–4 || 
|-

|- align="center" bgcolor="#CCFFCC" 
|64||W||March 1, 2003||5–4 OT|| align="left"|  Chicago Blackhawks (2002–03) ||26–25–9–4 || 
|- align="center" bgcolor="#FF6F6F"
|65||OTL||March 4, 2003||1–2 OT|| align="left"| @ St. Louis Blues (2002–03) ||26–25–9–5 || 
|- align="center" 
|66||T||March 6, 2003||2–2 OT|| align="left"|  Minnesota Wild (2002–03) ||26–25–10–5 || 
|- align="center" bgcolor="#CCFFCC" 
|67||W||March 7, 2003||2–1 || align="left"| @ Dallas Stars (2002–03) ||27–25–10–5 || 
|- align="center" bgcolor="#FFBBBB"
|68||L||March 10, 2003||1–3 || align="left"|  Montreal Canadiens (2002–03) ||27–26–10–5 || 
|- align="center" 
|69||T||March 12, 2003||2–2 OT|| align="left"| @ Pittsburgh Penguins (2002–03) ||27–26–11–5 || 
|- align="center" bgcolor="#FFBBBB"
|70||L||March 14, 2003||1–3 || align="left"| @ Minnesota Wild (2002–03) ||27–27–11–5 || 
|- align="center" bgcolor="#FFBBBB"
|71||L||March 15, 2003||0–1 || align="left"|  St. Louis Blues (2002–03) ||27–28–11–5 || 
|- align="center" bgcolor="#FFBBBB"
|72||L||March 17, 2003||3–5 || align="left"|  Edmonton Oilers (2002–03) ||27–29–11–5 || 
|- align="center" bgcolor="#FFBBBB"
|73||L||March 20, 2003||3–7 || align="left"| @ Vancouver Canucks (2002–03) ||27–30–11–5 || 
|- align="center" 
|74||T||March 22, 2003||1–1 OT|| align="left"| @ Calgary Flames (2002–03) ||27–30–12–5 || 
|- align="center" bgcolor="#FF6F6F"
|75||OTL||March 23, 2003||2–3 OT|| align="left"| @ Edmonton Oilers (2002–03) ||27–30–12–6 || 
|- align="center" 
|76||T||March 25, 2003||1–1 OT|| align="left"|  Philadelphia Flyers (2002–03) ||27–30–13–6 || 
|- align="center" bgcolor="#FFBBBB"
|77||L||March 27, 2003||1–4 || align="left"| @ Chicago Blackhawks (2002–03) ||27–31–13–6 || 
|- align="center" bgcolor="#FFBBBB"
|78||L||March 29, 2003||2–3 || align="left"|  Atlanta Thrashers (2002–03) ||27–32–13–6 || 
|- align="center" bgcolor="#FFBBBB"
|79||L||March 31, 2003||0–3 || align="left"| @ Detroit Red Wings (2002–03) ||27–33–13–6 || 
|-

|- align="center" bgcolor="#FF6F6F"
|80||OTL||April 1, 2003||1–2 OT|| align="left"|  Mighty Ducks of Anaheim (2002–03) ||27–33–13–7 || 
|- align="center" bgcolor="#FFBBBB"
|81||L||April 4, 2003||0–1 || align="left"| @ Phoenix Coyotes (2002–03) ||27–34–13–7 || 
|- align="center" bgcolor="#FFBBBB"
|82||L||April 6, 2003||0–2 || align="left"| @ Dallas Stars (2002–03) ||27–35–13–7 || 
|-

|-
| Legend:

Player statistics

Scoring
 Position abbreviations: C = Center; D = Defense; G = Goaltender; LW = Left Wing; RW = Right Wing
  = Joined team via a transaction (e.g., trade, waivers, signing) during the season. Stats reflect time with the Predators only.
  = Left team via a transaction (e.g., trade, waivers, release) during the season. Stats reflect time with the Predators only.

Goaltending
  = Joined team via a transaction (e.g., trade, waivers, signing) during the season. Stats reflect time with the Predators only.
  = Left team via a transaction (e.g., trade, waivers, release) during the season. Stats reflect time with the Predators only.

Awards and records

Awards

Transactions
The Predators were involved in the following transactions from June 14, 2002, the day after the deciding game of the 2002 Stanley Cup Finals, through June 9, 2003, the day of the deciding game of the 2003 Stanley Cup Finals.

Trades

Players acquired

Players lost

Signings

Draft picks
Nashville's draft picks at the 2002 NHL Entry Draft held at the Air Canada Centre in Toronto, Ontario.

See also
2002–03 NHL season

Notes

References

 

Nash
Nash
Nashville Predators seasons